The Jiugong Pier is a pier in Lieyu Township, Kinmen County, Taiwan.

History
The pier was built in 1974. In 1986, it was extended by 40.5 meters long and 7 meters wide.

Destinations
The pier serves for destination to Shuitou Pier in Jincheng Township, Greater Kinmen Island.

Transportation
The pier features a scooter rental nearby for visitors to use to tour around the island.

See also
 List of tourist attractions in Taiwan

References

1974 establishments in Taiwan
Piers in Kinmen County
Lieyu Township
Transport infrastructure completed in 1974